Wasted Lives is a 1925 American silent drama film directed by John Gorman and starring Elliott Dexter, Cullen Landis and Edith Roberts.

Cast
 Elliott Dexter as Clayton Gray
 Cullen Landis as John Grayson
 Edith Roberts as Mary 'Tommy' Townsend
 Betty Francisco as Grace Gardner
 Henry Hull		
 Hayford Hobbs  	
 Phillips Smalley

References

Bibliography
 Munden, Kenneth White. The American Film Institute Catalog of Motion Pictures Produced in the United States, Part 1. University of California Press, 1997.

External links

1925 films
1925 drama films
American black-and-white films
Silent American drama films
American silent feature films
1920s English-language films
Films directed by John Gorman
1920s American films